Jean-Patrick Gille (born 28 January 1962) was a member of the National Assembly of France
from 2007 to 2017.  He represented the 1st constituency of the Indre-et-Loire department, as a member of the Socialiste, radical, citoyen et divers gauche.

References

1962 births
Living people
Tibet freedom activists
Deputies of the 13th National Assembly of the French Fifth Republic
Deputies of the 14th National Assembly of the French Fifth Republic